Diego Abad de Santillán (20 May 1897 – 18 October 1983), also known as his born name Sinesio Baudilio García Fernández, was an anarcho-syndicalist activist and economist.

Selected works 

 After the Revolution: Economic Reconstruction in Spain Today (1937)

See also
Anarchism in Spain
Anarchist Catalonia
Anarchist economics
Gaston Leval
Matteotti Battalion

References

External links
 Diego Abad de Santillán papers at the International Institute of Social History

1897 births
1983 deaths
People from Montaña de Riaño
Spanish anarchists
Spanish anti-capitalists
Argentine anarchists
Spanish economists
Argentine economists
Spanish non-fiction writers
Argentine non-fiction writers
Argentine people of the Spanish Civil War
Politicians from Catalonia
Confederación Nacional del Trabajo members
Spanish expatriates in Argentina
20th-century non-fiction writers